Douglas Howe Adams (2 August 1876 – 27 January 1931) was an American cricketer, who played for the Gentlemen of Philapelphia in First class cricket.

References

External links
player profile

1876 births
1931 deaths
American cricketers
People from Cape May, New Jersey
Cricketers from New Jersey
Philadelphian cricketers
Sportspeople from Cape May County, New Jersey